"If Ever" is a song performed by 3rd Storee, issued as the first single from their eponymous debut album. The song peaked at #64 on the Billboard R&B chart in 1999.

Music video

The official music video for the song was directed by Mark Gerard.

Charts

References

1998 songs
3rd Storee songs
1999 debut singles
East West Records singles
Elektra Records singles
Songs written by Babyface (musician)